Bothriopupa is a genus of gastropods belonging to the family Vertiginidae.

The species of this genus are found in Central and Southern America.

Species:

Bothriopupa breviconus 
Bothriopupa conoidea 
Bothriopupa leucodon 
Bothriopupa peruviana 
Bothriopupa tenuidens 
Bothriopupa variolosa

References

Vertiginidae